Bruno Moreira Silva (born November 12, 1989) is a Brazilian football player.

Club statistics

References

External links

1989 births
Living people
Brazilian footballers
J2 League players
FC Gifu players
Brazilian expatriate footballers
Expatriate footballers in Japan
Association football midfielders